The Pallottines, officially named the Society of the Catholic Apostolate, abbreviated SAC, is a Society of Apostolic Life of Pontifical Right for men in the Roman Catholic Church, founded in 1835 by the Roman Catholic priest Saint Vincent Pallotti. Pallottines are part of the Union of Catholic Apostolate and are present in 45 countries on six continents. The Pallottines administer one of the largest churches in the world, the Basilica of Our Lady of Peace of Yamoussoukro in Côte d'Ivoire.

History

Vincent Pallotti was born in Rome in 1795. Together with a group of associates and collaborators, he developed in the city of Rome a large structure of apostolic activity, which included assisting the poor, the sick, and the marginalized; founding orphanages, institutions of charity, and shelters; and ministering to soldiers, workers, students, and prisoners. The Society, as a community of priests and brothers, was founded in Rome by Pallotti in 1835.

Vincent Pallotti died on 22 January 1850, without having seen the full development of his work. His closest collaborators continued his mission, ensuring further development of the Society. Vincent Pallotti was beatified in 1950 and canonized on 20 January 1963 by Pope John XXIII.

Apostolate

Not long after the death of his wife, Marianne, in 1880, English poet Coventry Patmore contacted the Pallotines about establishing a church in Hastings. St Mary Star of the Sea Church opened on 2 July 1883 and as of 2019 is still served by the Pallottines.

The Pallottine mission to Kamerun was established in 1890 in the German colony of Kamerun, today's Cameroon. The Fathers opened a number of missions and schools until 1916, when with the Kamerun campaign of World War I, they relocated south to Spanish Guinea. After the war, the Pallottines were replaced by the French Holy Ghost Fathers. The Pallottines returned to Cameroon in 1964.

In the present day, the Pallottines have expanded their missionary apostolate to Taiwan and the Philippines. The Society conducts parishes, schools, missions, clinics, retreat houses, all types of charitable works, and the scientific Institute for Catholic Church Statistics in Poland. In 1915 the Society founded the St. Paulusheim Gymnasium in Bruchsal, Germany and in 1954 the Bishop Eustace Preparatory School in Pennsauken, New Jersey. The Pallottines also founded and direct the Catholic Apostolate Center in Washington, D.C., which develops programs to help strengthen the Society's mission.

Irish Pallottines
The Irish Pallottine Province, now known as the Mother of Divine Love Province, came to Ireland in 1909. The Pallottine College in Thurles, Co. Tipperary, served as a seminary for the Irish Province with students also being trained in theology in the nearby St. Patrick's College, Thurles. The Irish Pallottines have served in England, Argentina, United States, Rome (Church of San Silvestro in Capite) and East Africa (Kenya, Uganda and Tanzania), as well as being entrusted with the running of two parishes, Corduff and Shankill, in the Archdiocese of Dublin. The provincial headquarters was in Argentina but moved to London in 1928, before moving to Dublin in 1978.
As well as the Thurles College and Retreat Centre, the Headquarters and formation centre is in Dundrum, Dublin. 
The Irish Pallottine Community Cemetery is at St. Mary's, Cabra, Thurles.
The Irish Bishop Séamus Freeman, S.A.C. 1944 – 2022, was a member of the Pallottine Order as was Bishop Patrick Winters, S.A.C. 1908 – 1994.

Provincials of Irish Pallotines
 Rev. William Hanly S.A.C.
 Rev. Patrick Dwyer S.A.C.
 Rev. John Fitzpatrick S.A.C.
 Rev. Eamonn Monson S.A.C.
 Rev. Derry Murphy S.A.C.

Pallottine Martyrs
Józef Jankowski was a Pallottine from Poland who was sent to Auschwitz during World War II. He was killed there after being beaten by a camp capo. Jankowski was beatified by Pope John Paul II in Poland in 1999. Jozef Stanek was also a Pallottine from Poland who was martyred during World War II.  

Jorge Mario Cardinal Bergoglio, SJ, later Pope Francis, opened the cause in Argentina for beatification—the first step towards sainthood—for five members of the Pallottine community. The candidates for beatification are three priests and two seminarians killed by the military dictatorship in Argentina in 1976: Alfredo Leaden, Alfredo Kelly, Peter Duffau and seminarians Salvador Barbeito and Emilio Barletti.

See also

Joseph Kentenich
Religious institute (Catholic)
Secular institute
Vocational Discernment in the Catholic Church
 Union of Catholic Apostolate

References

Further reading
 Ngoh, Victor Julius (1996): History of Cameroon Since 1800. Limbe: Presbook.
 Gaynor, John S., SCA (1962): The Life of St. Vincent Pallotti. Cork, Ireland: Mercier Press.

External links
 
 Immaculate Conception Province USA
  Mother of God Province USA
 Friends of Irish Pallottines
 Irish Pallottines

 
1835 establishments in Italy
Religious organizations established in 1835
Societies of apostolic life